KHOB (1390 AM) is a radio station licensed to Hobbs, New Mexico, United States. The station is currently owned by American Asset Management.

On May 21, 2017 KHOB changed to an adult standards format with local news and events. It previously carried a sports format.

References

External links

HOB
Radio stations established in 1954
1954 establishments in New Mexico
Adult standards radio stations in the United States